Hickson is an English surname. Notable people with the surname include:

Catherine Hickson (born 1955), Canadian volcanologist
Claude Hickson (1878–1948), New Zealand cricketer
Darby Hickson, American graphic designer, wife of Karl Rove
David Hickson (disambiguation), multiple people
Ella Hickson (born 1985), British playwright
Geoff Hickson (born 1939), English former football goalkeeper
Ian Hickson, Swiss-British proponent of web standards
Irene Hickson (1915–1995), catcher in the All-American Girls Professional Baseball League
J.W.A. Hickson (1873–1956), Canadian psychologist and mountaineer
JJ Hickson (born 1988), American basketball player
Joan Hickson (1906–1998), British actress
John Lawrence Hickson (1862–1920), English rugby union player
John Hickson (cinematographer) (fl. 1928–1940), American cinematographer
John Hickson (cricketer) (1864–1945), English first-class cricketer
Joseph Hickson (1830–1897), Canadian railway executive
Julie Hickson, American film producer and screenwriter
Mabel Murray Hickson (1859–1922), English writer of short stories
Michael Hickson (died 2020), quadriplegic who died of COVID-19
Oswald Hickson (1877–1944), English lawyer
Samuel Hickson (fl. 1895–1903), English association footballer
Simon Hickson, British comedian from duo Trevor and Simon
Sydney J. Hickson (1859–1940), British zoologist
William Edward Hickson (1803–1870), British educational writer

See also
Fraser-Hickson Library
Hickson, North Dakota
Hickson & Welch
Hickson Compact Group
William Hickson Barton
Hixon (disambiguation)
Hicks (disambiguation)
Hick (disambiguation)

English-language surnames
Patronymic surnames
Surnames from given names